Sacombe Green is a hamlet located to the east of the village of Sacombe, in the East Hertfordshire district, in the county of Hertfordshire, England.

External links 
 Listed buildings in Sacombe Green
 http://www.british-history.ac.uk/report.aspx?compid=43592

Hamlets in Hertfordshire
East Hertfordshire District